Central City Stadium may refer to:

 Tsentralnyi Stadion (Cherkasy), Ukraine
 Tsentralnyi Stadion (Mykolaiv), Ukraine
 Tsentralnyi Stadion (Vinnytsia), Ukraine
 Tsentralnyi Stadion (Zhytomyr), Ukraine

See also
 Central Stadium (disambiguation)